The September 1948 Florida hurricane also known as (Easy) was the most intense tropical cyclone to make landfall in the state since the 1935 Labor Day hurricane. The fourth hurricane and third major hurricane of the season, this storm developed from a tropical wave over the Caribbean Sea on September 18. Early the next day, the system strengthened into a hurricane while moving westward passing close to Grand Cayman, Cayman Islands. Thereafter, it curved northwestward and continued to deepen. By September 20, the system turned northward and later that day made landfall in Zapata Peninsula, Cuba as a Category 3 hurricane on the modern day Saffir–Simpson hurricane wind scale. Another landfall occurred in Cuba early the next day to the south of Güines. Severe destruction was reported on the island, with winds up to  observed in Havana. Over 700 buildings were destroyed. Ten deaths occurred and damage totaled at least $2 million (1948 USD), while other sources estimate "several million dollars."

After emerging into the Straits of Florida on September 21, the storm resumed intensification, before striking near Boca Chica Key, Florida with winds of 120 mph (195 km/h). By early on September 22, the system peaked as a Category 4 hurricane with maximum sustained winds of 130 mph (215 km/h). Shortly thereafter, another landfall occurred near Chokoloskee, Florida at the same intensity. Severe damage was reported in the state due to strong winds. The storm was considered the worst in Key West since the 1919 Florida Keys hurricane. Throughout the state, 1,200 homes were severely damaged or destroyed, while 40 businesses were demolished and 237 suffered impact. Throughout Florida, there were three fatalities and approximately $12 million (1948 USD) in damage, over half of which was inflicted on crops. The storm rapidly weakened while crossing the state and emerged into the Atlantic Ocean as only a Category 1 hurricane later on September 22. Slight fluctuations in intensity occurred before the hurricane became extratropical early on September 24, while located northwest of Bermuda.

Meteorological history

A tropical wave – an elongated trough of low pressure – was detected moving through the Leeward Islands on September 14. The system acquired a circulation while situated between Grand Cayman and Jamaica on September 18. Thus, a tropical storm developed at 06:00 UTC. With initial sustained winds of 45 mph (75 km/h), the storm quickly intensified while heading westward, and became a Category 1 hurricane on the modern-day Saffir–Simpson hurricane wind scale early on September 19 while passing near Grand Cayman, Cayman Islands. Later that day, the storm strengthened into a Category 2 hurricane and then a Category 3 hurricane only six hours after. The hurricane turned northward on September 20 and made landfall on the Zapata Peninsula of Cuba with winds of 125 mph (205 km/h) at 22:00 UTC. With the storm continuing to move northward, it made another landfall in Cuba at 01:00 UTC the following day near Güines, Mayabeque Province. Emerging into the Straits of Florida early on September 21, the hurricane weakened somewhat to a minimal Category 3 hurricane while moving across Cuba.

The hurricane restrengthened slightly on September 21, before making landfall near Boca Chica Key, Florida at 17:00 UTC, with sustained winds of 120 mph (195 km/h). Around that time, the storm's eye was only  in diameter. However, it deepened further and became a Category 4 hurricane early on September 22. Simultaneously, it struck near Chokoloskee, Florida. Due to the storm's barometric pressure at the time, it was the most intense tropical cyclone landfall in Florida since the 1935 Labor Day hurricane. Several locations reported an "eye", leading some meteorologists at the time to suggest that the storm had multiple circulations, though others theorized that dry air pockets existed between the rainbands. The hurricane rapidly weakened while moving northeastward across the state and was only a Category 1 hurricane upon emerging into the Atlantic Ocean near Jensen Beach late on September 22. Slight re-intensification occurred the following day, with the storm becoming a moderate Category 2 hurricane by 12:00 UTC. The remnants accelerated to the east-northeastward and continued to weaken, before dissipating hundreds of miles east of Newfoundland on September 26.

Preparations and impact

Offshore Grand Cayman, the British steamer Lochmonar, with 72 people aboard, encountered the hurricane on September 19. The ship ran aground in seas that were "as rough as hell". They were safely rescued by a United States Coast Guard tugboat on September 20.

Strong winds were reported on Cuba, with sustained winds up to  observed in Havana. Damage was particularly severe in that city and Matanzas. Almost 700 buildings were destroyed. Damage on the island totaled "several million dollars", with some sources reporting at least $2 million. There were ten deaths and at least 200 injuries in Cuba.

In preparation for the storm, the American Red Cross opened 213 shelters, which were collectively occupied by 38,323 people. Officials prepared two trains at Fort Pierce to evacuate residents living along Lake Okeechobee. Many residents in the area sought higher ground, but most refused to evacuate via the trains. Strong winds lashed Florida, with a sustained wind speed of  observed at the Naval Air Station Key West, before the anemometer blew away. There, 30 commercial and private aircraft were destroyed. Winds de-roofed some homes and businesses nearby. The hurricane was considered the worst in Key West since 1919. About  of rain fell on the Florida Keys.

In Homestead, a tornado destroyed a farmhouse and overturned a  truck. Two deaths occurred in Miami; a woman was electrocuted by a broken wire, while a man was presumably blown off a 5-story building. In the neighborhood of Coconut Grove, docking facilities, piers, and houseboats were severely damaged. Strong winds downed palm trees, which littered the streets of Lummus Park. The road to the Haulover Bridge in Miami Beach was washed away. Pasture lands were flooded, drowning some cattle and prompting a massive evacuation of herds to higher ground. Widespread damage to crops, particularly citrus and tropical fruits, was also reported along east coast of Florida as far north as the Indian River.

Throughout Florida, a total of 39 homes were destroyed, while 1,161 others were severely damaged. Further, 40 buildings were demolished and 237 suffered impact. Three deaths were reported in Florida. Additionally, there were 45 injuries requiring hospitalization. Overall, damage in the state totaled about $12 million, with $5 million inflicted to property, $6.5 million to crops, $300,000  to electrical services, and $200,000 to roadway infrastructure, including bridges.

See also

List of Florida hurricanes
Hurricane Charley
Hurricane Irene (1999)
 Hurricane Ian- Made landfall at the same intensity.

Notes

References

External links
Monthly Weather Review

1940s Atlantic hurricane seasons
1948 in Cuba
1948 in Florida
1948
Hurricanes in Cuba
Hurricanes in Florida
1948 natural disasters in the United States
1948 meteorology
Florida hurricane
Florida hurricane